Jenny Lee (born 1972) is a Singaporean venture capitalist and managing partner of GGV Capital based in Shanghai. Lee was the first woman venture capitalist to break into the top 10 of Forbes Midas List in 2015.

In 2019, she ranked #86 on Forbes World's 100 Most Powerful Women list, and in 2021, ranked #33 on The Midas List.

Early and personal life 
Lee was born in Singapore to a Chinese schoolteacher father and a housewife mother. Her brother Hong Meng is an engineer. She was a student of CHIJ Saint Nicholas Girls' School and Hwa Chong Junior College.

She is married to Vincent Koh.

Career 
A ST Engineering scholar, she studied engineering at Cornell University in New York from 1991 to 1995 and graduated with a Bachelor of Arts and Science and a Master of Science. Upon her return, she joined ST Aerospace as a jet engineer.
   
In 2001, she obtained a Master of Business Administration from the Kellogg School of Management in Chicago. It was her two-year stint at Kellogg that opened her eyes to a different career path.

Seeing the US stock market boomed and then busted in 2001 and how the capital markets affected everyone, it made her realised "the big world outside and she wanted to get out there and learn some more."

In 2001, she returned to Singapore.

She found a job with Morgan Stanley in Hong Kong. A year later, she joined Japanese venture-capital firm, JAFCO Asia.

In 2005, she joined GGV Capital as a managing partner and was involved in setting up GGV presence in China. While working with GGV, the firm invested in startups such as Alibaba, Didi Chuxing, Xiaomi, Toutiao, and Grab.

References

External links 
 

1972 births
Living people
Singaporean venture capitalist
Singaporean investors
Cornell University alumni
Kellogg School of Management alumni